Amboseli Airport  is an airport in Kenya.

Location
Amboseli Airport is in Kajiado County, in Amboseli National Park, in south-central Kenya, close to the international border with the Republic of Tanzania.

The geographic coordinates of Amboseli Airport are 2° 38' 42.00"S, 37° 15' 0.00"E (Latitude: -2.64500; Longitude:37.25000).

Overview
Amboseli Airport serves Amboseli National Park. The small airport receives regular scheduled service from Airkenya and unscheduled service from aircharter service providers.

Airlines and destinations

See also
 Amboseli National Park
 Kenya Airports Authority
 Kenya Civil Aviation Authority
 List of airports in Kenya

References

External links
 Location of Amboseli Airport At Google Maps
  Website of Kenya Airports Authority
  Airkenya Flight Routes

Airports in Kenya
Airports in Rift Valley Province
Kajiado County